Bamber Gascoyne of Childwall Hall, Lancashire (1725–1791), was an 18th-century English politician who sat in the House of Commons of Great Britain between 1761 and 1786.

Gascoyne was the son of Sir Crisp Gascoyne and Margaret Bamber. After his education at Felsted School, he matriculated at Queen's College, Oxford, in 1743.

Gascoyne served as member of Parliament for several constituencies including Maldon (1761–1763), Midhurst (1765–1768), and Truro (1774–1784). From 1779 to 1782 he was a Lord Commissioner of the Admiralty in the administration of Lord North.

He married Mary Green, daughter of Isaac Green, a Lancashire lawyer, and his wife Mary Aspinwall. He was the father of Bamber Gascoyne (junior) and Isaac Gascoyne, ancestor of TV quizmaster Bamber Gascoigne.

References

1725 births
1791 deaths
People educated at Felsted School
Alumni of The Queen's College, Oxford
British MPs 1761–1768
British MPs 1768–1774
British MPs 1774–1780
British MPs 1780–1784
British MPs 1784–1790
Members of the Parliament of Great Britain for constituencies in Cornwall
Members of Parliament for Maldon
Politicians from Liverpool
People from Childwall
Lords of the Admiralty